Donaldo Gugliermo "Dennis" Farina (February 29, 1944 – July 22, 2013) was an American stage and film actor, who worked for years as a Chicago police detective. 

Often typecast as a mobster or police officer, he is known for roles such as FBI Agent Jack Crawford in Manhunter, mobster Jimmy Serrano in the comedy Midnight Run, Ray "Bones" Barboni in Get Shorty,
Cousin Avi in Snatch, and Walt Miller in New Girl. He starred on television as Lieutenant Mike Torello on Crime Story and as NYPD Detective Joe Fontana on Law & Order.  From 2008 to 2010, he hosted and narrated the television program Unsolved Mysteries on Spike TV.  His last major television role was in HBO's Luck, which premiered on January 29, 2012.

Early life and police career 
Farina was born on a Leap Day (February 29, 1944) in Chicago's Old Town neighborhood, the fourth son and youngest of the seven children of Joseph and Yolanda Farina. Farina's father, who was from Villalba, Sicily, was a Chicago-area doctor, and his mother a homemaker. They raised their children in a North Avenue home in Old Town, a working-class neighborhood with a broad ethnic mixture, with Italians and Germans the predominant ethnicities.

Before becoming an actor, Farina served three years in the United States Army during the Vietnam Era, followed by 18 years in the Chicago Police Department (1967 to 1985), during which he advanced from patrolman to detective.

Acting career

Stage performances 
In 1982, while still working as a detective, he made his stage debut in the Steppenwolf Theater Company production of A Prayer for My Daughter, directed by John Malkovich. Chicago Tribune critic Richard Christianson criticized the production but said that Farina and other actors had "moments that were riveting." 

Reviewing a 1983 production of David Rabe's Streamers, Christianson praised Farnia's performance as "beautiful" and said "he is becoming a fine actor." In 1984, he appeared as Nick in a Chicago production of William Saroyan's The Time of Your Life. Ted Levine, who appeared with him in Crime Story, was in the cast.

Film and TV career 
Farina began working for director Michael Mann as a police consultant, which led Mann to cast him in a small role in the 1981 film Thief. Farina worked with Mann again, as mobster Albert Lombard, in several episodes of Miami Vice. He moonlighted as an actor in Chicago-based films (like Code of Silence, a 1985 Chuck Norris film) and theater before Mann chose him for his Crime Story series, which aired on NBC from 1986 to 1988. He later starred as the title character in Buddy Faro, a short-lived 1998 private detective series on CBS.

Farina played mob boss Jimmy Serrano in the comedy-crime film Midnight Run; and Ray "Bones" Barboni, a rival criminal to Chili Palmer, in Get Shorty. He played FBI Agent Jack Crawford in Michael Mann's Manhunter, the first film to feature the character Hannibal Lecter. His other film appearances include Steven Spielberg's Saving Private Ryan, Striking Distance, Another Stakeout, Snatch, The Mod Squad, Reindeer Games, Men of Respect, Big Trouble and Out of Sight. He played a baseball manager in Little Big League and a nemesis basketball coach in Eddie.

In a departure from his usual parts, he had a leading-man role, co-starring with Bette Midler, in the romantic comedy That Old Feeling (1997), directed by Carl Reiner.

Farina won an American Comedy Award for his performance in Get Shorty, and starred in the television sitcom In-Laws from 2002 until 2003. He appeared in the 2002 film Stealing Harvard, a comedy where he played a tough-talking, overprotective father-in-law. He had comic roles opposite Ed Harris and Helen Hunt in the HBO production of Empire Falls in 2005, and opposite Alan Rickman in the 2008 Bottle Shock.

Working as a voice-actor beginning in early 2005, he provided the voice of aging boxer-turned-superhero Wildcat on Justice League Unlimited. In early 2013, he voiced the father of Daffy Duck's girlfriend on The Looney Tunes Show, and played himself in an April 13, 2014, episode of the animated series Family Guy called "The Most Interesting Man in the World," aired posthumously, one of his final acting roles.

In 2004, producers of the television series Law & Order hired him as Detective Joe Fontana, following the death of longtime cast member Jerry Orbach. Farina stayed on the show for two seasons. In May 2006, it was announced he was leaving Law & Order for other projects, including the 2007 You Kill Me opposite Ben Kingsley and the 2008 What Happens in Vegas with Cameron Diaz and Ashton Kutcher.

His role of Detective Lt. Mike Torello on Crime Story was as a Chicago police officer, assigned to the U.S. Justice Department. Farina's Law & Order character, Detective Fontana, worked for Chicago Homicide before his transfer to the NYPD. Fontana shared a number of other characteristics with the actor who played him since they came from the same Chicago neighborhood, attended the same parochial school and had the same tastes in clothes and music and were fans of the Chicago Cubs.

He appeared in two television network miniseries based on Joe McGinniss's true-crime books, Blind Faith (1990) and Cruel Doubt (1992). He made a rare western, portraying legendary lawman Charlie Siringo in a 1995 television movie, Bonanza: Under Attack, a followup to the hit 1960s series.

In October 2008, he became the new host of Unsolved Mysteries when it returned to television with a new five-season, 175-episode run on Spike TV. Farina replaced Robert Stack, who had hosted the series for its prior 15-year run. This version featured re-edited segments from previous incarnations on NBC, CBS and Lifetime.

He played the title role in a 2011 independent film, The Last Rites of Joe May, written and directed by Joe Maggio, shot on location in Chicago. He was among the stars of a 2014 release, Authors Anonymous, playing a wannabe novelist with a fantasy of becoming another Tom Clancy.

Again on television, Farina co-starred in the 2012 HBO horse-race gambling series Luck, with Dustin Hoffman, directed by Michael Mann. He had a recurring guest role in 2013 in the television comedy series New Girl, though his character was killed off prior to his death.

Farina's last film role was as an aging Italian playboy in a film version of the Off-Broadway musical Lucky Stiff co-starring Dominic Marsh, Nikki M. James and Jason Alexander. The film, released posthumously in 2014, was dedicated to his memory.

Personal life 

Farina was married to Patricia Farina from 1970 until their divorce in 1980. They had three sons, Dennis Jr., Michael and Joseph (who is also an actor); two granddaughters, Brianna and Olivia; and four grandsons, Michael, Tyler, Matthew and Eric. He lived with his longtime girlfriend Marianne Cahill in Chicago and Scottsdale, Arizona.

A lifelong Chicago Cubs fan, he played a Cubs fan in a 1988 revival of the successful 1977 Organic Theater Company stage play Bleacher Bums, written by and starring fellow Chicago actors Joe Mantegna and Dennis Franz.

Farina was arrested on May 11, 2008, for carrying a loaded .22-caliber pistol through Los Angeles International Airport security. He was taken to the Los Angeles Police Department's Pacific Division and booked on suspicion of carrying a concealed weapon, with bail set at $25,000. He claimed he had simply forgotten the weapon was still in his briefcase and never intended to take it on a plane. After police determined the weapon was unregistered, the charges were upgraded to a felony and bail was increased to $35,000. After reaching a plea agreement with prosecutors, he pleaded no contest and was sentenced to two years' probation on July 17, 2008.

Death 
Farina died on July 22, 2013, in a Scottsdale, Arizona hospital from a pulmonary embolism. He was buried at Mount Carmel Cemetery at Hillside, Illinois.

Filmography

Television

References

External links 

 

1944 births
2013 deaths
20th-century American male actors
21st-century American male actors
Male actors from Chicago
Male actors from Scottsdale, Arizona
American male film actors
American people of Italian descent
People of Sicilian descent
American police detectives
American male television actors
Chicago Police Department officers
Deaths from pulmonary embolism
United States Army soldiers
Burials at the Bishop's Mausoleum, Mount Carmel Cemetery (Hillside)